The Catholic Church in Denmark is part of the worldwide Catholic Church, under the spiritual leadership of the Pope in Rome.

The number of Catholics in Denmark, a predominantly Lutheran country, comprises 1.3% of the population.

History
The Catholic Church has been present in the area that now constitutes the Kingdom of Denmark since Saint Ansgar in the 9th century initiated a Danish mission. However, the Lutheran Reformation in 1536 meant an end to Catholicism in Denmark for nearly a century and a half. In 1682, it was re-recognized by the Danish state, along with the Reformed Church and Judaism, although conversion to Catholicism from Lutheranism remained illegal. The constitution of 1849 provided for religious freedom and the Catholic Church was again allowed to spread in Denmark, but it has never grown to become more than a small minority.

On 22 January 2021, Cardinal Jean-Claude Hollerich denounced a proposed Danish law that would require translation of all sermons into the Danish language. Though Catholics believe that the proposed regulation is aimed primarily at Muslims, the Danish bishops have said that its passage will chill religious freedom for all, and place a burden on the church, which celebrates Mass in at least 9 languages nationwide.

Organizations
The highest office in the Catholic Church in Denmark has since 1995 been held by bishop Czeslaw Kozon, who participates in the Scandinavian Bishops Conference. Bishop Czeslaw Kozon resides in St. Ansgar's Cathedral, Copenhagen, which is dedicated to the 
patron saint of Denmark.

The Diocese of Copenhagen covers the whole of the country, together with the Faroe Islands and Greenland, and as such is one of the largest Catholic dioceses by area in the world.

See also
Knud den Hellige (1043–1086) – Danish king and saint.
Niels Steensen (1638–1686) – a Dane beatified by Pope John Paul II.

References

External links
Statistics relating to the Catholic Church in Denmark
Den Katolske Kirke i Danmark
Traditional Catholic Rite in Denmark

 
Denmark